RUST was a Finnish rock band from Helsinki formed in 2001. The band's first album, Softly, was released in Finland in August 2004 and reached Top 50 on the national album chart with promising reviews in music papers, magazines and web magazines in Europe. Finland's top nationwide rock radio network YleX chose Softly as the album of the week in August 2004. The singer and bass guitarist, Mikko Herranen, has produced all of the band's recordings, including three full-length albums, two EPs and five singles.

In spring 2011, RUST decided to disband. The final performance was in Helsinki on 25 May 2011.

Members 
 Mikko Herranen – bass, vocals
 Arto "Zenko" Kuronen – guitar, vocals
 Kimmo "kN" Nissinen – guitar, vocals
 Rainer "Raikku" Tuomikanto – drums

Former members 
 Atte Sarkima – drums
 Antti Leminen – drums
 Risto Niinikoski – drums
 Mikko Kaakkurinniemi – drums
 Jura Sarlin – bass guitar

Discography

Videography 
 I Don't Belong – Tuuliajolla 2006
 Ordinary World 2004
 Hate Me – live at Nosturi 2004
 Down 2003

References

External links 
RUST official fan page
RUST Myspace

Musical groups established in 2001
Finnish heavy metal musical groups